Banitsa is a village in Vratsa Municipality, Vratsa Province, northwestern Bulgaria.  its population is 1,328.

The great Bulgarian poet and revolutionary Hristo Botev was killed nearby.

Gallery 

Villages in Vratsa Province